A list of films produced in France in 1927:

See also
1927 in France

References

External links
French films of 1927 on IMDb
French films of 1927 at Cinema-francais.fr

1927
Lists of 1927 films by country or language
Films